Obvinsk is a rural locality (a selo) and the administrative center of Obvinskoye Rural Settlement, Karagaysky District, Perm Krai, Russia. The population was 583 as of 2010. There are 21 streets.

Geography 
Obvinsk is located 30 km north of Karagay (the district's administrative centre) by road. Kolyshkino is the nearest rural locality.

References 

Rural localities in Karagaysky District